Union Township is one of sixteen townships in Elkhart County, Indiana. As of the 2010 census, its population was 6,134.

History
Union Township was organized in 1837.

Geography

Cities and towns
 Nappanee (east half)

Unincorporated towns
 Foraker
 Gravelton
(This list is based on USGS data and may include former settlements.)

Adjacent townships
 Harrison Township (north)
 Elkhart Township (northeast)
 Jackson Township (east)
 Van Buren Township, Kosciusko County (southeast)
 Jefferson Township, Kosciusko County (south)
 Scott Township, Kosciusko County (southwest)
 Locke Township (west)
 Olive Township (northwest)

Major highways

Cemeteries
The township contains one cemetery, Bull.

References
 United States Census Bureau cartographic boundary files
 U.S. Board on Geographic Names

External links
 Indiana Township Association
 United Township Association of Indiana

Townships in Elkhart County, Indiana
Townships in Indiana
1837 establishments in Indiana
Populated places established in 1837